Gaëlle Skrela (born 24 January 1983) is a retired French basketball player for Basket Lattes and the French national team, where she participated at the 2014 FIBA World Championship. In 2016 she represented France at the 2016 Summer Olympics where her team lost 67-86 to the United States. She retired from basketball soon after the end of the Olympic games.

She is a sister to French international rugby union player David Skrela and is a daughter of former coach, Jean-Claude Skrela.

References

1983 births
Living people
Sportspeople from Toulouse
French women's basketball players
French people of Polish descent
Guards (basketball)
Basketball players at the 2016 Summer Olympics
Olympic basketball players of France
France women's national basketball team players